Shilin District (also spelled Shihlin District) is a district of Taipei. The central command center of the Republic of China Navy (ROCN) is located in Shilin.

History
The name Shilin was derived from Pattsiran, the indigenous Ketagalan word for "hot springs". It was then transliterated into Chinese as "", which has been written as Pat-chi-na or Pachina.

Prior to Han Chinese settlement, the area was home to the Kimassauw community of the Taiwanese indigenous peoples. During the Qing era, a fort was set up, later called Zhilan Yi Bao (first fort/settlement of Pattsiran). By the late Qing dynasty, "many literary talents from Shilin had passed the imperial examination", prompting the local gentry to rename it Shilin, meaning "congregation of scholars and talents".

In 1945 after World War II, it was modified to Shilin Township, Taipei County.

Shilin is foremost a residential district and has several famous neighborhoods, such as Waishuangxi and Tianmu. Kuomintang leader Chiang Kai-shek lived in Shilin after moving the Chinese Nationalist government to Taiwan after the Chinese Civil War. The district is divided up into 51 villages, which are further divided up into 987 neighborhoods.

The district can be said to be the origin of culture in Taipei. During the Qing Dynasty, many private, public and community schools were opened in the area. During the Japanese era, a national learning center was set up at Zhishanyan.

Education

Shilin has three universities: Ming Chuan University, Soochow University, and the Chinese Culture University. Several international schools, including the Taipei American School, Taipei Japanese School, The Primacy Collegiate Academy and Taipei European School are located in this district. The district is also home to two vocational colleges, four senior high schools, eight junior high schools, and twenty elementary schools.

The National Taiwan Science Education Center is also located in this district, along with the Taipei Astronomical Museum, the Shung Ye Museum of Formosan Aborigines, and the world-renowned National Palace Museum.

Institutions
 Commercial Office of Brazil to Taipei
 Embassy of Eswatini in Taipei

Tourism

The district is home to many national historical sites, including historical temples, markets, and buildings. Tourist attractions include:
 Yangmingshan National Park
 Shihlin Paper Mill
 National Palace Museum
 Taipei Astronomical Museum
 National Taiwan Science Education Center
 Chien Mu House
 Hwa Kang Museum
 Chiang Kai-shek's Shilin Official Residence
 Shilin Shennong Temple
 Lin Yutang House
 Tianmu White House
 Taiwan Traditional Theatre Center
 Chin Shan Yen Hui Chi Temple
 Chin Shan Yen Gate
 Taipei Children's Amusement Park
 Shilin Night Market
Shilin Cixian Temple

The Tatun Volcano Group is located northeast of the district. The district is also the location of the Tianmu Baseball Stadium, Bailing Sport Park, Shilin Fitness Center and Chinese Culture and Movie Center. The Shuangxi Park and Chinese Garden is also located in Shilin.

Transportation

In addition to many bus lines, the district is served by Jiantan, Shilin, and Zhishan metro stations of the Taipei Metro Tamsui-Xinyi Line. It is served by Provincial Highway No. 2A and 2B, as well as many other major roads that run through the city.

Sister cities

Los Altos, California, USA
Walnut, California, USA

Notable natives

 Chang Hsin-yan, actress
 Huang Ching-yin, politician
 Ko Chia-yen, actress
 Miu Chu, singer
 Selina Jen, singer and actress

See also
 District (Taiwan)

References

External links

 
  

Districts of Taipei